Church Hill Historic District may refer to:

Church Hill Historic District (New Canaan, Connecticut), listed on the National Register of Historic Places in Fairfield County, Connecticut
Church Hill Historic District (Portage, Wisconsin), listed on the National Register of Historic Places in Columbia County, Wisconsin